Nacopa melanderi is a species of moth in the family Noctuidae (the owlet moths). It was first described by William Barnes and Foster Hendrickson Benjamin in 1927 and it is found in North America.

The MONA or Hodges number for Nacopa melanderi is 9828.

References

Further reading

 
 
 

Amphipyrinae
Articles created by Qbugbot
Moths described in 1927